Lodune Ki Sincaid (May 7, 1973 – April 7, 2019) was an American professional mixed martial artist. He was WEC Light Heavyweight Champion in 2006, and was featured on the UFC's The Ultimate Fighter 1 reality show, losing to Bobby Southworth by knockout in the first elimination match of the season. He also competed in the World Fighting Alliance and Palace Fighting Championship.

Mixed martial arts career

Early career
Sincaid made his professional debut in 2001 fighting in small promotions, and started off his career dominating his opponents, achieving a 6–0 record with all of the wins coming by submission or knockout.

The Ultimate Fighter
The UFC had been following Sincaid's career closely and invited him to compete on the first-ever Ultimate Fighter. He fought for Team Couture, led by Randy Couture, and was eliminated by future Strikeforce Light Heavyweight Champion Bobby Southworth by knockout in the first elimination match.

Sincaid was handed his first professional loss at The Ultimate Fighter 1 Finale against future UFC Middleweight Championship contender Nate Quarry, via TKO due to punches.

WEC
Sincaid made his debut in the WEC against former WEC Heavyweight Champion James Irvin. Sincaid won the bout via unanimous decision and was then offered an opportunity to fight for the WEC Light Heavyweight Championship at WEC 20, and won by a rear-naked choke submission, becoming the new WEC Light Heavyweight Champion.

Sincaid then lost his next two fights, the first being against Jason "Mayhem" Miller at WFA: King of the Streets by a rear-naked choke submission and then in his next fight Sincaid lost the WEC Light Heavyweight Championship belt to Doug Marshall by knockout. After his fight with Miller, it was revealed that Sincaid tested positive for marijuana.

Post-WEC
After the demise of the WEC, Sincaid appeared in the Palace Fighting Championship organization as well as other small organizations.

Personal life
Sincaid publicly spoke about his struggle with PTSD from the military and genetic bipolar disorder.

On April 11, 2019, news surfaced that Lodune had been found dead in his apartment on April 7, 2019.

Mixed martial arts record

|-
| Loss
| align=center| 15–9
| Givanildo Santana
| TKO (punches)
| CCS: Collision in the Cage
| 
| align=center| 3
| align=center| 4:27
| Irvine, California, United States
| 
|-
| Loss
| align=center| 15–8
| Eric Davila
| TKO (punches)
| Adrenaline: Feel the Rush
| 
| align=center| 3
| align=center| 1:15
| San Angelo, Texas, United States
| 
|-
| Win
| align=center| 15–7
| Larry Hopkins
| Submission (punches)
| Steele Cage MMA: Battle of the Texas Titans
| 
| align=center| 1
| align=center| N/A
| Frisco, Texas, United States
| 
|-
| Loss
| align=center| 14–7
| Cyrille Diabaté
| TKO (punches)
| PFC 12: High Stakes
| 
| align=center| 2
| align=center| 1:15
| Lemoore, California, United States
| 
|-
| Win
| align=center| 14–6
| Kyle Keeney
| TKO (punches)
| CageSport MMA
| 
| align=center| 1
| align=center| 4:58
| Tacoma, Washington, United States
| 
|-
| Win
| align=center| 13–6
| Rafael Real
| Submission (guillotine choke)
| PFC 8: A Night of Champions
| 
| align=center| 1
| align=center| 1:03
| Lemoore, California, United States
| 
|-
| Loss
| align=center| 12–6
| Cory Devela
| Decision (unanimous)
| Seasons Beatings 21
| 
| align=center| 3
| align=center| 5:00
| Portland, Oregon, United States
| 
|-
| Loss
| align=center| 12–5
| Jeremy Freitag
| Decision (split)
| Palace Fighting Championship: Project Complete
| 
| align=center| 3
| align=center| 5:00
| 
| 
|-
|  Win
| align=center| 12–4
| Rob Wince
| KO (knee)
| King of Kombat: King of Kombat
| 
| align=center| 1
| align=center| 3:10
| Austin, Texas, United States
| 
|-
| Win
| align=center| 11–4
| Robert Hunsperger
| Submission (rear-naked choke)
| NLF: No Limits Fighting
| 
| align=center| 1
| align=center| 1:31
| 
| 
|-
| Win
| align=center| 10–4
| Kenny Ento
| TKO (punches)
| PFC 2: Fast and Furious
| 
| align=center| 2
| align=center| 2:09
| Lemoore, California, United States
| 
|-
| Loss
| align=center| 9–4
| Doug Marshall
| KO (punches)
| WEC 23: Hot August Fights
| 
| align=center| 2
| align=center| :51
| Lemoore, California, United States
| Lost the WEC Light Heavyweight Championship
|-
| Loss
| align=center| 9–3
| Jason Miller
| Submission (rear-naked choke)
| WFA: King of the Streets
| 
| align=center| 1
| align=center| 4:29
| Los Angeles, California, United States 
| Sincaid tested positive for marijuana
|-
| Win
| align=center| 9–2
| Dan Molina
| Submission (rear-naked choke)
| WEC 20: Cinco de Mayhem
| 
| align=center| 1
| align=center| 3:17
| Lemoore, California, United States
| Won the vacant WEC Light Heavyweight Championship
|-
| Win
| align=center| 8–2
| James Irvin
| Decision (unanimous)
| WEC 19: Undisputed
| 
| align=center| 3
| align=center| 5:00
| Lemoore, California, United States
| 
|-
| Win
| align=center| 7–2
| Alex Schoenauer
| Submission (choke)
| SportFight 14: Resolution
| 
| align=center| 1
| align=center| 3:40
| Portland, Oregon, United States
| 
|-
| Loss
| align=center| 6–2
| Kyacey Uscola
| TKO (corner stoppage)
| X Fighting Championships: Dome of Destruction 3
| 
| align=center| 2
| align=center| 3:20
| Tacoma, Washington, United States
| 
|-
| Loss
| align=center| 6–1
| Nate Quarry
| TKO (punches)
| The Ultimate Fighter 1 Finale
| 
| align=center| 1
| align=center| 3:17
| Las Vegas, Nevada, United States
| 
|-
| Win
| align=center| 6–0
| David Avilla
| TKO (punches)
| Universal Above Ground Fighting: Ultimate Cage Fighting 4
| 
| align=center| 1
| 
| Upland, California, United States
| 
|-
| Win
| align=center| 5–0
| Doug Sauer
| Submission (guillotine choke)
| Reality Submission Fighting: Shooto Challenge
| 
| align=center| 1
| align=center| 3:50
| Belleville, Illinois, United States
| 
|-
| Win
| align=center| 4–0
| Nate Schroeder
| Submission (keylock)
| Universal Above Ground Fighting: Ultimate Cage Fighting 3
| 
| align=center| 1
| N/A
| Hollywood, California, United States
| 
|-
| Win
| align=center| 3–0
| Kelly English
| KO 
| Kage Kombat
| 
| align=center| 1
| 
| Los Angeles, California, United States 
| 
|-
| Win
| align=center| 2–0
| Shawn Menendes
| Submission 
| Kage Kombat
| 
| align=center| 1
| 
| California, United States
| 
|-
| Win
| align=center| 1–0
| Jason Miller 
| Submission (keylock)
| Reality Submission Fighting 2
| 
| align=center| 1
| align=center| 3:46
| 
|

References

External links

 

1973 births
2019 deaths
Sportspeople from Saint Paul, Minnesota
American male mixed martial artists
World Extreme Cagefighting champions
Middleweight mixed martial artists
Light heavyweight mixed martial artists
Mixed martial artists from Minnesota